Tilathi Koiladi is a rural municipality in Saptari District in the Sagarmatha Zone of south-eastern Nepal. At the time of the 2017 Nepal census it had a population of 32,389 people living in 9845 individual households.

References 

Municipalities in Madhesh Province
Populated places in Saptari District
VDCs in Saptari District
Rural municipalities of Nepal established in 2017
Rural municipalities in Madhesh Province